Despite the Falling Snow is a 2004 book by Shamim Sarif. It was first published on May 4, 2004 through Headline Book Publishing and is set during two different time periods. One part of the story is set in 1950s Moscow, Russia during the Cold War years, while the other follows the story of 1992 Moscow and London in the period after the collapse of USSR.

Critical reception for the novel was mostly positive, with The Bulletin praising it as a "mature romance". The Boston Globe also praised the novel, citing the character of Katya as a highlight.

Plot summary

After an early career amongst the political elite of Cold War Russia, Alexander Ivanov has lived in America for forty years and has managed to bury the tragic memories surrounding his charismatic late wife, Katya – or so he believes.

For into his life come two women – one who will start to open up the heart he has protected for so long; another who is determined to uncover the truth about what really happened to Katya all those years ago. The novel’s journey back to the snowbound streets of post-Stalinist Moscow reveals a precarious, dangerous world of secrets and treachery.

Film adaptation

A film adaptation of the novel was announced in early 2013 at the Cannes Festival. The film starring Mission: Impossible – Rogue Nation Swedish actress Rebecca Ferguson, Game of Thrones actor Charles Dance, Oliver Jackson-Cohen, Antje Traue, Sam Reid, Anthony Head, and Danish actor Thure Lindhardt was released in UK on April 15, 2016.

When the preview of Despite The Falling Snow the film appeared on YouTube a song performed by Ella Henderson called "Now You Say You Love Me" featured prominently toward the end. The film was directed by the author of the original book – Shamim Sharif. Hanan Kattan and Lisa Tchengiuz served as the Executive producers. The music was composed by Rachel Portman and the cinematography was by David Johnson.

References

External links
 
 
 
 Interview for The Telegraph

2004 books